The Huichol people of western Mexico exude an enduring spirit and passion to hold on to their traditions.  This is exemplified in the pilgrimage route between Nayarit and Huiricuta, stretching nearly 800 km, wherein dozens of sacred sites are visited along the way.  The route follows the old pre-Hispanic trade routes between the Gulf of Mexico and the Pacific Ocean.  One of the most important of these routes, to Huiricuta or Wirikuta, is known as such for its historical importance in the preservation of Huichol cultural as well as the sheer proliferation of pilgrims that follow the route.  Because the Huichol have no written language, the pilgrimage has the added importance of linking  populations of Huichol and disseminating knowledge of culture and reinforcing cultural practices.

World Heritage status 
This site was added to the UNESCO World Heritage Tentative List on December 6, 2004 in the Mixed (Cultural + Natural) category.

Notes

References 
Huichol Route through the sacred sites to Huiricuta (Tatehuari Huajuye) - UNESCO World Heritage Centre Retrieved 2009-03-02.

Huichol
Religion in Mexico
World Heritage Tentative List for Mexico